Lee Da-hye may refer to:

 Lee Da-hye (Go player) (born 1985), South Korean Go player
 Lee Da-hye (swimmer) (born 1987), South Korean swimmer
 Lee Da-hye (footballer) (born 1992), South Korean association footballer

See also
 Lee Da-hae (born 1984), Korean Australian actress